Laminacauda pacifica is a species of sheet weaver found in the Juan Fernandez Islands. It was described by Berland in 1924.

References

Linyphiidae
Spiders of South America
Spiders described in 1924